The Nationalist Movement Party (alternatively translated as Nationalist Action Party; , MHP) is a Turkish far-right and ultranationalist political party. The group is often described as neo-fascist, and has been linked to some violent paramilitaries and organized crime groups. Its leader is Devlet Bahçeli.

The party was formed in 1969 by former Turkish Army colonel Alparslan Türkeş, who had become leader of the Republican Villagers Nation Party (CKMP) in 1965. The party mainly followed a Pan-Turkist and Turkish nationalist political agenda throughout the latter half of the 20th century. Devlet Bahçeli took over after Türkeş's death in 1997. The party's youth wing is the Grey Wolves (Bozkurtlar) organization, which is also known as the "Nationalist Hearths" (Ülkü Ocakları) which contributed to the political violence in Turkey in the 1970s.

Alparslan Türkeş founded the party after criticizing the Republican People's Party (CHP) for moving too far away from the nationalist principles of their founder Mustafa Kemal Atatürk, claiming that he would not have founded the MHP had the CHP not deviated from Atatürk's ideology. The MHP won enough seats in the 1973 and 1977 general election to take part in the "Nationalist Front" governments during the 1970s. The party was banned following the 1980 coup, but reestablished with its original name in 1993. After Türkeş's death and the election of Devlet Bahçeli as his successor, the party won 18% of the vote and 129 seats in the 1999 general election, its best ever result. Bahçeli subsequently became Deputy Prime Minister after entering a coalition with the Democratic Left Party (DSP) and the Motherland Party (ANAP), though his calls for an early election resulted in the government's collapse in 2002. In the 2002 general election, the MHP fell below the 10% election threshold and lost all of its parliamentary representation after the newly formed Justice and Development Party (AKP) won a plurality.

After the 2007 general election, in which the MHP won back its parliamentary representation with 14.27% of the vote, the party has strongly opposed the peace negotiations between the government and the Kurdistan Workers Party and used to be fiercely critical of the governing AKP over government corruption and authoritarianism. Nevertheless, the MHP has often been referred to by critics as the "AKP's lifeline", having covertly helped the AKP in situations such as the 2007 presidential election, repealing the headscarf ban, and the June–July 2015 parliamentary speaker elections. Since 2015, Bahçeli has been openly supporting Erdoğan and the AKP. This caused a schism within the party, resulting in Meral Akşener leaving MHP to found the centrist and pro-European İYİ Party. The MHP supported a 'Yes' vote in the 2017 referendum, and formed the People's Alliance electoral pact with the AKP for the 2018 Turkish general election. MHP currently supports a minority government led by the AKP.

History

Before 1980
In 1965, nationalist politician and ex-Colonel Alparslan Türkeş, who had trained in the United States for NATO, founded the Turkish Gladio Special Warfare Department, gained control of the conservative rural Republican Villagers Nation Party (CKMP). During an Extraordinary Great Congress held at Adana in Turkey on 1969, Türkeş changed the name of the party to the Nationalist Movement Party (MHP) and with the support of Dündar Taşer, a party logo depicting the three crescent was elected.

The MHP embraced Turkish nationalism, and under the leadership of Türkeş, militias connected to the party were responsible for assassinating numerous left-wing intellectuals and academics, including some Kurds, during the 1970s. The leader of the party's youth wing, known as the Grey Wolves after Turkic mythology, claimed that they had an intelligence organization that was superior to the state's own.

On the other hand, MHP had links to the Aydınlar Ocağı (AO; "Hearth of Intellectuals"), a right-wing think tank launched in 1970 by established university professors, which served as a connecting link between secular-conservative, nationalist and Islamic rightists, promoting the ideology of Turkish-Islamic synthesis. AO's ideas, which have been compared to those of the French Nouvelle Droite, had a determining influence on MHP's programmes and served to lend the far-right party a more legitimate, respectable appearance.

The MHP won enough seats in the 1973 and 1977 general election to take part in the "Nationalist Front" governments during the 1970s. The party infiltrated the bureaucracy during these governments during the height of the political violence between rightists and leftists. On May 27, 1980, the party's deputy leader and former government minister Gün Sazak was assassinated by members of the Marxist–Leninist militant group Revolutionary Left ( or Dev Sol) in front of his home.

When the Turkish army seized power on September 12, 1980, in a violent coup d'état led by General Kenan Evren, the party was banned, along with all other active political parties at the time, and many of its leading members were imprisoned. Many party members joined the neoliberal Anavatan Partisi or various Islamist parties. Party member, Agah Oktay Güner, noted that the party's ideology was in power while its members were in prison.

Re-establishment
The party was reformed in 1983 under the name "Conservative Party". After 1985, however, the name was changed to the "Nationalist Task Party" then back again to its former name in 1992. In 1993, Muhsin Yazıcıoğlu and five other deputies separated and founded the Great Union Party, which is an Islamist party.

Devlet Bahçeli 
After Türkeş's death, Devlet Bahçeli was elected his successor. The party won 18% of the vote and 129 seats in the election that followed, in 1999, its best ever result. Bahçeli subsequently became Deputy Prime Minister after entering a coalition with the Democratic Left Party (DSP) and the Motherland Party (ANAP), though his calls for an early election resulted in the government's collapse in 2002. In the subsequent 2002 general election, the MHP fell below the 10% election threshold and lost all of its parliamentary representation after the newly formed Justice and Development Party (AKP) won a plurality.

After the 2007 general election, in which the MHP won back its parliamentary representation with 14.27% of the vote, the party has strongly opposed the peace negotiations between the government and the Kurdistan Workers Party and used to be fiercely critical of the governing AKP over government corruption and authoritarianism. Nevertheless, the MHP has often been referred to by critics as the "AKP's lifeline", having covertly helped the AKP in situations such as the 2007 presidential election, repealing the headscarf ban, and the June–July 2015 parliamentary speaker elections. Since 2015, Bahçeli has been openly supporting Erdogan and the AKP. This caused a schism within the party, resulting in Meral Akşener leaving MHP to found the center-right İYİ Party. The MHP supported a 'Yes' vote in the 2017 referendum, and formed the People's Alliance electoral pact with the AKP for the 2018 Turkish general election. MHP currently supports a minority government led by the AKP, and has 48 MPs in the Turkish Parliament.

Ideology
The MHP represents the Nine-Light doctrine, based on Turkish nationalism shaped by Islam. The MHP is widely described as a neo-fascist party linked to extremist and violent militias, as well as organized crime groups. Since the 1990s it has, under the leadership of Devlet Bahçeli, gradually moderated its programme, turning from ethnic to cultural nationalism and conservatism and stressing the unitary nature of the Turkish state. Notably, it has moved from strict, Kemalist-style secularism to a more pro-Islamic stance, and has – at least in public statements – accepted the rules of parliamentary democracy. Some scholars doubt the sincerity and credibility of this turn and suspect the party of still pursuing a neo-fascist agenda behind a more moderate and pro-democratic façade. Nevertheless, MHP's mainstream overture has strongly increased its appeal to voters and it has grown to the country's third-strongest party, continuously represented in the National Assembly since 2007 with voter shares well above the 10% threshold.

Opposition to the HDP

Due to their ideological differences, the MHP is strongly opposed to any form of dialogue with the left-wing pro-Kurdish Peoples' Democratic Party (HDP), which Devlet Bahçeli has often opposed by voting against in Parliament. A notable example was in the June–July 2015 parliamentary speaker elections, where the MHP declared that they would not support any candidate and cast blank votes after the HDP announced support for the Republican People's Party (CHP) candidate Deniz Baykal. The MHP also ruled out any prospect of a coalition government that receives support from the HDP after the June 2015 general election resulted in a hung parliament, even rejecting CHP leader Kemal Kılıçdaroğlu's offer of Bahçeli becoming Prime Minister in such a coalition. MHP deputy leader Celal Adan claimed that 'even using our party's name in the same sentence as the HDP will be counted as cruelty by us.'

In early September 2015, the MHP and the HDP both voted against the new interim election government ministers from taking their oaths of office, causing speculation of whether the MHP was dropping their harsh stance against the HDP. However, Semih Yalçın downplayed any notions of an alliance between the two parties, stating that "a broken clock will still show the correct time once a day, the HDP can sometimes take a correct decision in Parliament. Showing this as a 'MHP-HDP coalition' is a deliberate diversion." In 2021 Bahçeli has demanded the closure of the HDP in several speeches, a move that is considered un-democratic and authoritarian.

Economic policies 
During the June 2015 Turkish general election, the MHP announced a new economic manifesto. The MHP promised to improve the situation of Turkey’s working poor by lifting taxes on diesel and fertiliser, raising the net minimum wage to $518, giving a $37 transportation subsidy to every minimum wage worker, and giving those who cannot afford a house an additional $92 per month in rental aid. The MHP said these policies would allow a minimum wage earner living in a big city to earn as much an extra $646 annually.

The MHP stated that their economic policies would create 700,000 jobs, increase the national income per person to $13.3K, and increase exports to $238 billion while keeping annual growth at 5.2 percent between 2016 and 2019, although this did not occur, as the GDP per capita and standard of living plummeted in Turkey from 12,614 USD in 2014 to 9,126 in 2019.

Controversies
In July 2015, amidst a wave of protests against the Xinjiang conflict, MHP-affiliated Ülkücü attacked South Korean tourists on Istanbul's Sultanahmet Square. In an interview with Turkish columnist Ahmet Hakan, MHP leader Devlet Bahçeli played the attacks down, stating that "These are young kids. They may have been provoked. Plus, how are you going to differentiate between Korean and Chinese? They both have slanted eyes. Does it really matter?" Bahceli's remarks, including a banner reading "We crave Chinese blood" at the Ülkücü Istanbul headquarters, caused an uproar in both Turkish and international media.

Party leaders

 deputies,

Election results

General elections

Senate elections

Local elections

See also
Akkan Suver
Nine Lights Doctrine

References

Further reading

External links

Official website
Official website of Ülkü Ocakları (Grey Wolves)
Nationalist Movement Party Multimedia

 
Idealism (Turkey)
Far-right political parties in Turkey
Nationalist parties in Turkey
Political parties in Turkey
Right-wing populism in Asia
Right-wing populism in Turkey
Right-wing populist parties
National conservative parties
Social conservative parties
Anti-communism in Turkey
1969 establishments in Turkey
Conservative parties in Turkey
Eurosceptic parties in Turkey
Neo-fascist parties
Pan-Turkist organizations
Political parties established in 1969